Collegiate School was a secondary school for boys that operated from 1853 until 1902 in Kingston, Jamaica. Herbert George de Lisser went to the school while it was headed by William Morrison. Andrew J. Milne was also a headmaster at the school. Laurence R. Fyfe went to Collegiate.

References

1853 establishments in the British Empire
1902 disestablishments in the British Empire
Boys' schools in Jamaica
Schools in Kingston, Jamaica